Edward Henry Peers (26 April 1873–1905) was an English footballer who played in the Football League for Burton United, Nottingham Forest and Walsall.

References

1873 births
1905 deaths
English footballers
Association football defenders
English Football League players
West Bromwich Albion F.C. players
Walsall F.C. players
Nottingham Forest F.C. players
Burton United F.C. players